"The Rubberband Man" is a song recorded by the American vocal group the Spinners.

The song, written by producer Thom Bell and singer-songwriter Linda Creed, was about Bell's son, who was being teased by his classmates for being overweight.  Intended to improve his son's self-image, the song eventually evolved from being about "The Fat Man" to "The Rubberband Man".

The last major hit by the Spinners to feature Philippé Wynne on lead vocals, "The Rubberband Man" spent three weeks at number two on the U.S. Billboard Hot 100 (blocked from the top spot by Rod Stewart's massive hit single "Tonight's the Night") and topped the U.S. R&B chart at the end of 1976. It was also a top-20 hit in the UK Singles Chart, reaching number 16 in October 1976.

The song was included in the Detroit Free Presss "Detroit's 100 Greatest Songs" list, ranking 70th.

Arrangement and structure
Wynne alternates between singing the verse and interjecting verbal asides and improvises the eight bars linking the chorus with the bridge. The backing singers' retort of "do-do-do-do" recalls the distinctive chorus in Stephen Stills' song "Love the One You're With."

Later uses

 Performed by Lynda Carter in a 1980 episode of The Muppet Show, accompanied by a band of Rubberband Men Muppets.
 The song also appears in the 1981 movie Stripes.
 "The Rubberband Man" was used on the TV show Suits in the 2012 episode "Discovery".
 The song enjoyed a surge in popularity in 2018 as a result of its use in the Marvel Cinematic Universe film Avengers: Infinity War.
 From 2004–2007 in several back-to-school advertising campaigns for OfficeMax, the song Rubberband Man was used as the theme for The 'Rubberband Man', a character played by actor Eddie Steeples, who would happily distribute school / office supplies to surprised and somewhat disappointed children or thankful office employees. In one commercial, Steeple's character has lost his rubber ball, and the commercial documents his search for the missing ball.     At that time, Steeples was popular portraying the character of "Crab Man" on the television sitcom My Name Is Earl.

Personnel
 Lead vocals: Philippé Wynne
 Background vocals: Bobby Smith, Pervis Jackson, Henry Fambrough and Billy Henderson
 Additional background vocals: the Sigma Sweethearts (Barbara Ingram, Carla L Benson and Yvette Benton)
 Instrumentation: MFSB:
Thom Bell: keyboards 
Tony Bell, Bobby Eli: guitars
Bob Babbitt: bass guitar
Andrew Smith: drums
Larry Washington: percussion

Produced, arranged and conducted by Thom Bell

Charts

Weekly charts

Year-end charts

All-time charts

References

External links
 

1976 singles
The Spinners (American group) songs
Songs written by Linda Creed
Songs written by Thom Bell
1976 songs
Atlantic Records singles